Parsa (Persian: پارسا pārsā) as a given name or surname is from Persian origin meaning "devout, pious".

It may refer to:

Places

Nepal
Parsa, Rupandehi, a village development committee in Rupandehi District, Lumbini Zone, Nepal
Parsa, Sarlahi, a rural municipality in Sarlahi District, Nepal
Parsa District, a district in Narayani Zone, Nepal
Parsa National Park, south-central Nepal
Parsa Bazar, a town east of Bharatpur, in Chitwan District, Nepal

Other places
Persis, an exonym for the region in southwest Iran with the endonym "Parsa".
Parsa (Vidhan Sabha constituency), an assembly constituency in Bihar, India
Parsa, Ghazipur, a village in Ghazipur District, Uttar Pradesh, India
 Pārsa or Persepolis, a city built by Darius the Great, serving as capital of the Achaemenid Empire in Persia (Iran)
Parsa, Mazandaran, a village in Mazandaran Province, Iran
Parsa, Godda, a village in Jharkhand, India

People

Given name
Parsa Pirouzfar (born 1972), Iranian actor, theatre director, acting instructor, playwright, translator

Surname
Ahmad Parsa (1907–1997), Iranian botanist
Ali Parsa (born 1965), British-Iranian healthcare entrepreneur and former investment banker
Asghar Parsa (1919–2007), member of Iran's National Front
Davood Parsa-Pajouh, Iranian scholar at the University of Tehran
FakhrAfagh Parsa (1898–?), Iranian journalist during the Iranian Constitutional Revolution and a member of the Women's Movement in Iran
Farrokhroo Parsa (1922–1980), Iranian physician, educator, parliamentarian and government minister
Khwaja Abu Nasr Parsa (died 1460), a spiritual leader of the Naqshbandi order of Sufism
Michael Parsa, Canadian politician who was elected to the Legislative Assembly of Ontario
Nasrat Parsa (1968–2005), Afghan singer
Niloofar Parsa, Iranian actress
Reza Parsa, Swedish film director

Other uses
Parsa (TV series), a Pakistani drama TV series
PARSA, an early name of Turismo Aéreo, today known as Air Panama
Pars (disambiguation)
Fars (disambiguation)
Persia (disambiguation)